Colonel Sir Donald Hamish Cameron of Lochiel,  (12 September 1910 – 26 May 2004) was a Scottish soldier, landowner, businessman and the 26th Lochiel of Clan Cameron. Lochiel served as commanding officer of the Lovat Scouts throughout the Second World War. He succeeded his father as Chief of the Camerons in 1951 and later served as Lord Lieutenant of Inverness. His grandfather was the 5th Duke of Montrose and his cousin, the 7th Duke of Montrose was a prominent Rhodesian government minister.

Early life
Born at Buchanan Castle near Drymen, the ancestral seat of his mother, Cameron was the son of Sir Donald Walter Cameron, 25th Lochiel and Lady Hermione Emily Graham (1882–1978), daughter of Douglas Graham, 5th Duke of Montrose. After attending Harrow, the 19-year-old Master of Lochiel was commissioned as an officer in the Lovat Scouts before going to Balliol College, Oxford where he graduated as BA in 1933.

Lovat Scouts and Second World War 

At the outbreak of the Second World War in 1939 he joined his regiment on mobilisation and was promoted to Major. Simon Fraser, 15th Lord Lovat, supported by Cameron, devised the strategy of Commandos – elite, unorthodox shock raiders, modelled on old Boer soldiers. In 1940 Winston Churchill gave his approval and the Commando Basic Training Centre (CBTC) was established. Between 1942 and 1946 over 25,000 personnel were trained at Achnacarry and it is widely believed that this was the birthplace of modern special forces.

In 1943 the Lovat Scouts were sent for specialist ski and mountain training in the Rocky Mountains of Alberta, Canada before being sent to Italy. Arriving in Naples in early 1944, Cameron fought at the infamous Battle of Monte Cassino, described as a scene of "utter and total devastation". He served with distinction for the remainder of the Italian campaign and was frequently mentioned in dispatches. After the German surrender, the Lovat Scouts moved to Austria to hunt for fugitive Nazi and SS personnel and occupied the village of Ebene Eichenau in the Alps. He was promoted to Lieutenant-Colonel and then Colonel in 1945. Cameron was stationed in Greece before the regiment was disbanded in 1947.

Upon his former regiments disbandment he was transferred to the Queen's Own Cameron Highlanders, the ancestral regiment of the Camerons which had been founded in 1793 by Alan Cameron of Erracht. From 1958 Cameron served as Honorary Colonel of the 4th and 5th Battalion of the Queen’s Own Cameron Highlanders (TA).

Later life 
After active service, Cameron worked in London as an accountant and qualified as FCA. He and his wife lived in Kensington, London before taking up residence at Achnacarry Castle upon his succession as Clan Chief in 1951 following the death of his father.

His experience as a chartered accountant helped with the restructuring of the Cameron estates, which were subject to considerable death duties upon the death of his father, Sir Donald Cameron 25th of Lochiel. Through the sale of Fassiefern and Drimsallie, as well as land on the north side of Loch Arkaig, the 26th Lochiel successfully negotiated the austere post-war economic conditions, developing a sustainable future for the regional economy. His popularity in the Scottish Highlands saw him elected a County Councillor on Inverness County Council, serving until 1971.

Cameron was Chairman of Scottish Widows (Life Assurance) between 1964 and 1967, and Vice-chairman of the Royal Bank of Scotland from 1969 until 1980. He was also a Crown Estates Commissioner from 1957 until 1969, and President of the Scottish Landowners Federation (1979–85).

He was Lord-Lieutenant of Inverness-shire from 1971 to 1985. In 1973 he was knighted and made a Knight of the Thistle by Queen Elizabeth II. Following his knighthood, Cameron's banner hung in St Giles' Cathedral, Edinburgh until his death in May, 2004.

Family 
On 21 July 1939 he married Margaret Doris (Margot) Gathorne-Hardy, only daughter of Lieutenant-Colonel Hon. Nigel Gathorne-Hardy DSO JP, son of John Gathorne-Hardy, 2nd Earl of Cranbrook, by his New Zealand wife Doris Featherston Johnston, daughter of Sir Charles Johnston. Lochiel and Margot had four children:

 Margaret Anne Cameron (born 1942), married Timothy Nott-Bower, son of Sir John Nott-Bower and had issue.
 Caroline Marion Cameron (1943–2019), married Blaise Hardman, son of Air Chief Marshal Sir Donald Hardman and had issue.
 Donald Angus Cameron, 27th and present Lochiel (born 1946). 
 John Alastair Nigel Cameron (born 1954).

Honours 
  – KT 1973
  – CVO 1970 
  – KStJ 1974
  – TD 1944
  – 1939–1945 Star 
  – Italy Star
  – Defence Medal 
  – War Medal

See also 
 Achnacarry Castle
 Clan Cameron
 Chiefs of Clan Cameron
 Lovat Scouts
 List of Knights and Ladies of the Thistle
 Lord Lochiel
 Lyon Court

References

External links 
 www.nationalarchives.gov.uk
 www.lochiel.net
 Obituary in The Independent : Tam Dalyell MP
 History of the Camerons 
 www.heraldry-scotland.co.uk 
 www.burkespeerage.com

1910 births
2004 deaths
Lovat Scouts officers
Queen's Own Cameron Highlanders officers
British Army personnel of World War II
Members of Inverness County Council
Scottish landowners
Lord-Lieutenants of Inverness-shire
Deputy Lieutenants of Inverness-shire
Donald
Scottish clan chiefs
Commanders of the Royal Victorian Order
Knights of Justice of the Order of St John
Knights of the Thistle
Lochiel, Donald Hamish Cameron, 9th Lord
20th-century Scottish businesspeople